Kyung-Chik Han (1902–2000) was a Korean pastor and church planter and the recipient of the 1992 Templeton Prize for Progress in Religion.  

Born in Kan-ri, P'yŏngwŏn County,  Korea, Han graduated from Soongsil University (B. S. 1925), the College of Emporia (B. A. 1926), and Princeton Theological Seminary (B. D. 1929).  Ordained in 1933 by the Presbyterian Church of Korea, Han later founded Youngnak Presbyterian Church in 1945, which he pastored until 1973 and served as a Pastor Emeritus until his death.  At the time that he received the Templeton Prize, membership of Youngnak Presbyterian Church had grown to 60,000 making it the largest Presbyterian church in the world and the church had fostered about 500 sister churches worldwide.

Legacy 
Kyung-Chik Han is primarily known for his leadership and humility. While Young-nak is no longer the biggest church in South Korea, it is, however, the most prominent Protestant church in the country. Like Kyung-Chik Han himself, his church's earliest ministry was primarily to northern defectors and this remains a hallmark of Young-nak church to this day.

When he was awarded a Templeton prize, he sold it and gave the money to charity. When he retired he moved to a modest cabin in the mountains and ensured that his sons did not receive the inheritance from his ministry or assume his position as many ministers in Korea do. There is a small museum at Young-nak Church in his honour.

References

Bibliography 
Just Three More Years to Live! The Story of Rev. Kyung-Chik Han. 2005 

Templeton Prize laureates
1902 births
2000 deaths
Princeton Theological Seminary alumni
South Korean Protestant ministers and clergy
South Korean Presbyterians
College of Emporia alumni
Academic staff of Soongsil University